Ẁurdah Ïtah is the fourth studio album by French rock band Magma. The album was originally released on 15 June 1974 under the name Tristan et Iseult as a Christian Vander solo studio film soundtrack. The soundtrack was for Yvan Lagrange's 1972 avant-garde and incredibly obscure  film Tristan et Iseult.

The album was recorded by a core quartet of Magma members (only consisting of drums, bass, piano, and vocals). It was re-released on Magma's label Seventh Records in 1989 with the Magma logo on its cover, and ever since, it has been retrospectively contextualised as a Magma album.

Ẁurdah Ïtah (which translates from Kobaïan roughly as Dead Earth) is the second part of the Theusz Hamtaahk Trilogy. It is preceded by Theusz Hamtaahk (Time of Hatred), which is only available on live albums, including Retrospektïẁ (Parts I+II) (1981), and Trilogie Theusz Hamtaahk (Concert du Trianon) (2001), and succeeded by Mëkanïk Dëstruktïẁ Kömmandöh (1973).

Track listing 
Source: Seventh Records, Discogs

Personnel 
 Stella Vander – vocals
 Klaus Blasquiz – vocals, percussion
 Jannick Top – bass
 Christian Vander – drums, piano, Rhodes piano, percussion, vocals

References

Magma (band) albums
1974 albums